TR1 may refer to:

 C++ Technical Report 1, a document proposing additions to the C++ Standard Library
 Regency TR-1, an early transistor radio model
 Triumph TR1 / 20TS, an unsuccessful automobile prototype
 Tomb Raider (1996 video game), the first video game in the Tomb Raider series
 TR-1A or TR-1B, variants of the Lockheed U-2 surveillance aircraft
 Hitachi TR.1
 TR.1, see Orenda Engines
 TR1, a postal district in the TR postcode area
 TAS1R1, a taste receptor
 Tri-R KIS TR-1, an American aircraft design
 Lyulka TR-1, first Soviet turbojet engine
 Tropical Race 1, a strain of Fusarium oxysporum that causes the Panama disease
 Type 1 regulatory T cell (Tr-1), a T-lymphocyte lineage with immunoregulatory function
 Yamaha TR-1 High Output Boating Engine
 VR Class Tr1, a Finnish locomotive class